José Miguel Alcérreca Saldes (7 May 1845  – 21 August 1891) was a Chilean military officer. He participated in the War of the Pacific and in the Chilean Civil War of 1891 where he was killed in action at the Battle of Placilla fighting for President José Manuel Balmaceda.

Eponym
The town of Coronel Alcérreca in the municipality of General Lagos in the Arica and Parinacota Region bears his name.

Ranks
1865 : Second Lieutenant
1868 : Lieutenant
1872 : Captain
1880 : Major
1880 : Lieutenant Colonel
1887 : Colonel
1891 : Brigadier General

References

1845 births
1891 deaths
Chilean Army officers